Annareddy Guda (also spelled Annareddygudem) is a village of the Nalgonda district in the state of Telangana, India.  the 2011 Census of India, the village had a population of 675 people across 164 households.

References

Villages in Nalgonda district